Symmetrischema cestrivora is a moth in the family Gelechiidae. It was described by Clarke in 1950. It is found in Argentina (Tucuman).

The larvae feed on Cestrum lorentzianum.

References

Symmetrischema
Moths described in 1950